The Camden Town Group was a group of English Post-Impressionist artists founded in 1911 and active until 1913.  They gathered frequently at the studio of painter Walter Sickert in the Camden Town area of London.

History

In 1908, critic Frank Rutter created the Allied Artists Association (AAA), a group separate from the Royal Academy artistic societies and modelled on the French Salon des Indépendants. Many of the artists who became the Camden Town Group exhibited with the AAA.

The members of the Camden Town Group included Walter Sickert, Harold Gilman, Spencer Frederick Gore, Lucien Pissarro (the son of French Impressionist painter Camille Pissarro), Wyndham Lewis, Walter Bayes, J. B. Manson, Robert Bevan, Augustus John, Henry Lamb, Charles Ginner, and John Doman Turner.

Influences include Vincent van Gogh and Paul Gauguin whose work can clearly be traced throughout this group's work. Their portrayal of much of London before and during World War I is historically interesting and artistically important.

In the Cinema by Malcolm Drummond is noted for its claustrophobic feeling. It is an interesting foil to the work of Sickert who painted many rowdy music hall scenes, including Gallery of the Old Mogul (also depicting the viewers of a film). Sickert's Ennui of 1914 is often considered the masterpiece of this group's work, with its portrayal of boredom and apathy in the mold of Flaubert and others.

The group organized the exhibition of Cubist and Post-Impressionist paintings.

A major retrospective of the group's works was held at Tate Britain in London in 2008. The show did not include eight of the members, among them Duncan Grant, J. D. Innes, Augustus John, Henry Lamb, John Doman Turner, Wyndham Lewis and J. B. Manson, who was, according to Wendy Baron, of "too little individual character".

Members

It was decided that there should be a 16-member, men only, limit on the group: Maxwell Gordon Lightfoot died after the first exhibition, and Duncan Grant was elected to take his place.

Walter Bayes 
Robert Bevan 
Malcolm Drummond
Harold Gilman 
Charles Ginner
Spencer Frederick Gore
Duncan Grant
James Dickson Innes
Augustus John
Henry Lamb
Wyndham Lewis
Maxwell Gordon Lightfoot
J. B. Manson
Lucien Pissarro
William Ratcliffe
Walter Sickert
John Doman Turner

Although women were excluded from the Camden Town Group, a few women artists like Ethel Sands, Anna Hope Hudson and Marjorie Sherlock were involved on the periphery; others, like Sylvia Gosse, were cut out altogether.

See also

 Frank Rutter
 John Doman Turner
 The London Group

Notes and references

Further reading
Wendy Baron, Perfect Moderns: A History of the Camden Town Group, Ashgate, 2000  
Robert Upstone, Modern Painters: The Camden Town Group, exhibition catalogue, Tate Britain, London, 2008  
Helena Bonett, Ysanne Holt, Jennifer Mundy (eds.), The Camden Town Group in Context, Tate, May 2012, http://www.tate.org.uk/art/research-publications/camden-town-group

External links
 Camden Town Group in Context at Tate
 James Beechey on the Camden Town Group
 John Doman Turner

British artist groups and collectives
Post-Impressionism
English art
Camden Town
History of the London Borough of Camden